= Breno Altman =

Brazilian journalist and author (born 1961)

Breno Altman (born March 7, 1961) is a Brazilian journalist and author. He is the founder of news magazine Opera Mundi. He is the author of Contra o Sionismo.
